Greenville is an unincorporated community in Monroe County, West Virginia, United States. Greenville is located on West Virginia Route 122, west of Union. The community was formerly called Centreville.

Located near Greenville are Cook's Mill and the Miller-Pence Farm, both listed on the National Register of Historic Places.

References

Unincorporated communities in Monroe County, West Virginia
Unincorporated communities in West Virginia